Go There, Don't Know Where (translit. Podi tuda, ne znayu kuda) is a 1966 feature-length cutout-animated film from the Soviet Union. It was directed by the "Patriarch of Soviet animation", Ivan Ivanov-Vano, at the Soyuzmultfilm studio.

It is a comedy based on the motifs of Russian folk tales, in particular "Go I Know Not Whither and Fetch I Know Not What".

Creators

See also
History of Russian animation
List of animated feature films
List of stop-motion films

External links
 Go There, Don't Know Where at the Animator.ru (Russian and English)
 (Official Russian)
 Go There, Don't Know Where at myltik.ru 

1966 films
1966 in the Soviet Union
1960s fantasy films
Films based on fairy tales
Films based on Russian folklore
Films directed by Ivan Ivanov-Vano
1960s Russian-language films
1960s stop-motion animated films
Soviet animated films
Soyuzmultfilm
1966 animated films